Handikhola is a village of Manahari ruler Municipality in Makwanpur District in the Bagmati Province of southern Nepal. At the time of the 2011 Nepal census it had a population of 24,662 people living in 3,975 individual households.

References

Populated places in Makwanpur District